Arnold I of Laurenburg,  (died before 1154), was count of Laurenburg and an ancestor of the House of Nassau.

Life

Arnold was a son of Dudo of Laurenburg and the fourth of the seven daughters of count Louis I of Arnstein, possibly her name was Irmgardis or Demudis. 

Arnold is mentioned as count of Laurenburg between 1124 and 1148. He probably ruled together with his brother Rupert I. Arnold and Rupert built Nassau Castle around 1124.

In 1124, Arnold became the Vogt of Idstein. Idstein had come under the control of Count Dudo in 1122.

Arnold was the Vogt of St. George's Monastery in Limburg 1124–1148.

No marriage has been mentioned of Arnold.

Sources
 Parts of this article were translated from the corresponding Dutch Wikipedia on August 21st, 2018.
 
 
 
  Table 60.

References

External links 
 Family tree of the early House of Nassau.
 Nassau in: Medieval Lands. A prosopography of medieval European noble and royal families

House of Nassau
12th-century people of the Holy Roman Empire
Year of birth unknown
Year of death unknown